Dichomeris allantopa is a moth of the family Gelechiidae. It was described by Edward Meyrick in 1934. It is known from southern India.

The larvae feed on Dalbergia sissoides.

References

allantopa
Moths described in 1934
Moths of Asia